Ragnar Karl Magnusson (15 September 1901 – 4 March 1981) was a Swedish long-distance runner. He competed at the 1928 Summer Olympics in the 5,000 and 10,000 m events and finished in fifth and sixth place, respectively. Magnusson held Swedish titles in the 5,000 m in 1930, 1932 and 1933 and in the 10,000 m in 1932.

References

1901 births
1981 deaths
Swedish male long-distance runners
Olympic athletes of Sweden
Athletes (track and field) at the 1928 Summer Olympics
Athletes from Stockholm